Sadanander Mela (Bengali: সদানন্দের মেলা; English: The House of Sadananda) is a Bengali-language drama film from 1954, directed by Sukumar Dasgupta. The story is written by Mani Burma and screenplay by Premendra Mitra. The film stars Bhanu Banerjee, Chhabi Biswas, Uttam Kumar, Suchitra Sen. The music is composed by Kalipada Sen and edited by Biswanath Mitra. Cinematography is by Banku Roy.

Plot 
The film is about a few homeless who take shelter in an empty luxurious house under the leading of a strange man named Sadananda.

Cast 

 Bhanu Banerjee
 Kanu Banerjee as Jagadish
 Chhabi Biswas as Sadananda
 Pahari Sanyal as Dakshinaranjan 
 Uttam Kumar as Ajit
 Suchitra Sen as Shila

Soundtrack

External links 

 Sadanander Mela

References 

1954 films
Bengali-language Indian films
1950s Bengali-language films
Indian drama films
1954 drama films